The Public Procurement and Disposal of Public Assets Authority (PPDA) is a parastatal organisation in Uganda that is responsible for regulation and supervision of procurement and disposal of government-owned property and other assets.

Location
The headquarters of the PPDA are located on the 5th Floor, in the UEDCL Towers, at 37 Nakasero Road, on Nakasero Hill, in the Central Division of Kampala, the capital and largest city of Uganda. The coordinates of the location of the organisation's headquarters are:00°19'34.0"N, 32°34'38.0"E (Latitude:0.326111; Longitude:32.577222).

Overview
In 2003, the Ugandan parliament enacted the Public Procurement and Disposal of Public Assets Authority Act (PPDA Act). Following that, in February 2003, the Public Procurement and Disposal of Public Assets Authority (PPDA), was created and became operational. It is the "regulator of public procurement and disposal of public assets in Uganda".

, the PPDA faced challenges in the following areas: (1) At that time, the 70 employees were not enough to cater to the many services required of staff. (2) The Authority supervises procurement and disposal of assets in the central government and in all local governments across the country. However, the staffing and funding at the authority has remained static since its creation in 2003. (3) The Authority's offices are in Kampala. However, increasingly, the authority's services are needed in far-flung upcountry locations. There is difficulty in meeting the need for the authority's services upcountry, in view of limited resources in the areas of staff and funding. (4) Corruption remains a big challenge. (5) There are inadequate number of trained professionals in procurement in Uganda. The lack of experienced trained procurement officers in the districts and some central government ministries creates hardship in observing procurement regulations and guidelines.

See also
Uganda Ministry of Finance

References

External links
Public Procurement and Disposal of Public Assets Authority

 

Regulatory agencies of Uganda
Finance in Uganda
Organizations established in 2003
Kampala District
2003 establishments in Uganda
Uganda